Andrej Kvašňák (19 May 1936 – 18 April 2007) was a Slovak football player. Born in Košice, he played for Czechoslovakia, for which he played 47 matches and scored 13 goals. He is usually considered one of the best Czechoslovak footballers.

He was a participant in the 1962 FIFA World Cup, where Czechoslovakia finished second, and also in the 1970 FIFA World Cup.

In his country he played mostly for Sparta Prague. From September 1969 he played a few seasons for Racing Mechelen, a Belgian team.

Although often listed as a forward, he was in fact normally an attacking midfield schemer, forging a partnership in the centre of the park with Josef Masopust at international level. Well known for his technique and passing ability, he was also a prolific goalscorer and fine header of the ball.

References
 
 Obituary at UEFA.com
 Obituary

1936 births
2007 deaths
Czechoslovak footballers
1960 European Nations' Cup players
1962 FIFA World Cup players
1970 FIFA World Cup players
Deaths from lung cancer
Slovak footballers
Czechoslovakia international footballers
Sportspeople from Košice
Deaths from cancer in the Czech Republic
K.R.C. Mechelen players
FC VSS Košice players
AC Sparta Prague players
FK Viktoria Žižkov players
Association football midfielders
Association football forwards